Bellevue is a historic plantation house located at 200 Manning Road East, in Accokeek, Prince George's County, Maryland, United States. This Greek Revival style home was constructed in about 1840. It is one of only three surviving examples in Prince George's County of the once-popular Tidewater house style, typical of successful small plantations of that period. Bellevue is in excellent condition, and retains its freestanding chimneys with brick pent, as well as a roughly contemporary kitchen wing. The house stands on a five-acre, partially wooded lot which exemplifies its original plantation setting.

Bellevue was listed on the National Register of Historic Places in 1986.

References

External links
 , including photo in 1985, at Maryland Historical Trust website

Accokeek, Maryland
Houses in Prince George's County, Maryland
Houses completed in 1840
Houses on the National Register of Historic Places in Maryland
Plantation houses in Maryland
National Register of Historic Places in Prince George's County, Maryland